Field Marshal Garnet Joseph Wolseley, 1st Viscount Wolseley,  (4 June 183325 March 1913), was an Anglo-Irish officer in the British Army. He became one of the most influential and admired British generals after a series of successes in Canada, West Africa and Egypt, followed by a central role in modernizing the British Army in promoting efficiency.  He served in Burma, the Crimean War, the Indian Mutiny, China, Canada and widely throughout Africa—including his Ashanti campaign (1873–1874) and the Nile Expedition against Mahdist Sudan in 1884–85. Wolseley served as Commander-in-Chief of the Forces from 1895 to 1900. His reputation for efficiency led to the late 19th century English phrase "everything's all Sir Garnet", meaning, "All is in order."

Early life and education 
Lord Wolseley was born into a prominent Anglo-Irish family in Dublin, the eldest son of Major Garnet Joseph Wolseley of the King's Own Scottish Borderers (25th Foot) and Frances Anne Wolseley (née Smith). The Wolseleys were an ancient landed family in Wolseley, Staffordshire, whose roots can be traced back a thousand years. Wolseley was born at Golden Bridge House, the seat of his mother's family. His paternal grandfather was Rev. William Wolseley, Rector of Tullycorbet, and the third son of Sir Richard Wolseley, 1st Baronet, who sat in the Irish House of Commons for Carlow. The family seat was Mount Wolseley in County Carlow. He had four younger sisters and two younger brothers, Frederick Wolseley (1837–1899) and Sir George Wolseley (1839–1921).

Wolseley's father died in 1840 at age 62, leaving his widow and seven children to struggle on his Army pension. Unlike other boys in his class, Wolseley was not sent to England to attend Harrow or Eton, but was instead educated at a local school in Dublin. The family circumstance forced Wolseley to leave school at just 14, when he found work in a surveyor's office, which helped him bring in a salary and continue studying maths and geography.

Wolseley first considered a career in the church, but his financial situation meant that he would have needed a wealthy patron to support such an endeavor. Instead he sought a commission in the Army. Unable to afford Sandhurst or buying a commission, Wolseley wrote to his fellow Dubliner, Field Marshal The 1st Duke of Wellington, for assistance. Wellington, then the Commander-in-Chief of the Forces, promised to assist him when he turned 16. However, Wellington apparently overlooked him and did not respond to another letter sent when he was 17. Wolseley unsuccessfully appealed to his secretary, Lord Fitzroy Somerset. The British Army was then recovering from significant casualties in the latest war in South Africa, and Wolseley wrote to Somerset, "I shall be prepared to start at the shortest notice, should your Lordship be pleased to appoint me to a regiment now at the seat of war." His mother then wrote to the Duke to appeal his case, and on 12 March 1852, the 18-year-old Wolseley was gazetted as an ensign in the 12th Foot, in recognition of his father's service.

Second Burmese War

Just a month after he joined the 12th Foot, Wolseley transferred to the 80th Foot on 13 April 1852, with whom he served in the Second Anglo-Burmese War. He was severely wounded when he was shot in the left thigh with a jingal bullet on 19 March 1853 in the attack on Donabyu, and was mentioned in despatches. Promoted to lieutenant on 16 May 1853 and invalided home, Wolseley transferred to the 84th Regiment of Foot on 27 January 1854, and then to the 90th Light Infantry, at that time stationed in Dublin, on 24 February 1854. He was promoted to captain on 29 December 1854.

Crimea
Wolseley accompanied the regiment to the Crimea, and landed at Balaklava in December 1854. He was selected to be an assistant engineer, and attached to the Royal Engineers during the Siege of Sevastopol. Wolseley served throughout the siege, where he was wounded at "the Quarries" on 7 June 1855, and again in the trenches on 30 August 1855, losing an eye.

After the fall of Sevastopol, Wolseley was employed on the quartermaster-general's staff, assisting in the embarkation of the troops and supplies, and was one of the last British soldiers to leave the Crimea in July 1856.  For his services he was twice mentioned in despatches, received the war medal with clasp, the 5th class of the French Légion d'honneur and the 5th class of the Turkish Order of the Medjidie.

Six months after joining the 90th Foot at Aldershot, he went with it in March 1857 to join the troops being despatched for the Second Opium War. Wolseley was embarked in the transport Transit, which wrecked in the Strait of Banka. The troops were all saved, but with only their personal arms and minimal ammunition. They were taken to Singapore, and from there dispatched to Calcutta on account of the Indian Mutiny.

Indian Rebellion of 1857

Wolseley distinguished himself at the relief of Lucknow under Sir Colin Campbell in November 1857, and in the defence of the Alambagh position under Outram, taking part in the actions of 22 December 1857, of 12 January 1858 and 16 January 1858, and also in the repulse of the grand attack of 21 February 1858. That March, he served at the final siege and capture of Lucknow. He was then appointed deputy-assistant quartermaster-general on the staff of Sir Hope Grant's Oudh division, and was engaged in all of the operations of the campaign, including the actions of Bari, Sarsi, Nawabganj, the capture of Faizabad, the passage of the Gumti and the action of Sultanpur. In the autumn and winter of 1858–59 he took part in the Baiswara, trans-Gogra and trans-Rapti campaigns ending with the complete suppression of the rebellion. For his services he was frequently mentioned in dispatches, and having received the Mutiny medal and clasp, he was promoted to brevet major on 24 March 1858 and to brevet lieutenant-colonel on 26 April 1859.

During the rebellion, Wolseley displayed strong views towards native peoples, referring to them as "beastly niggers", and remarking that the sepoys had "barrels and barrels of the filth which flows in these niggers' veins".

Wolseley continued to serve on Sir Hope Grant's staff in Oudh, and when Grant was nominated to the command of the British troops in the Anglo-French expedition to China of 1860, accompanied him as the deputy-assistant quartermaster-general. He was present at the action at Sin-ho, the capture of Tang-ku, the storming of the Taku Forts, the Occupation of Tientsin, the Battle of Pa-to-cheau and the entry into Peking (during which the destruction of the Chinese Imperial Old Summer Palace was begun).  He assisted in the re-embarkation of the troops before the winter set in. He was Mentioned, yet again, in Dispatches, and for his services received the medal and two clasps. On his return home he published the Narrative of the War with China in 1860. He was given the substantive rank of major on 15 February 1861.

Canada

In November 1861, Wolseley was one of the special service officers sent to the Province of Canada in connection with the Trent incident.

In 1862, shortly after the Battle of Antietam, Wolseley took leave from his military duties and went to investigate the American Civil War. He befriended Southern sympathizers in Maryland, who found him passage into Virginia with a blockade runner across the Potomac River.  There he met Generals Robert E. Lee, James Longstreet and Stonewall Jackson. He also provided an analysis on Lieutenant General Nathan Bedford Forrest.  The New Orleans Picayune (10 April 1892) published Wolseley's ten-page portrayal of Forrest, which condensed much of what was written about him by biographers of the time.  This work appeared in the Journal of the Southern Historical Society in the same year, and is commonly cited today.  Wolseley addressed Forrest's role at the Battle of Fort Pillow near Memphis, Tennessee, in April 1864 in which black USCT troops and white officers were alleged by some to have been slaughtered after Fort Pillow had been conquered.  Wolseley wrote, "I do not think that the fact that one-half of the small garrison of a place taken by assault was either killed or wounded evinced any very unusual bloodthirstiness on the part of the assailants."

Wolseley returned to Canada where he became a brevet colonel on 5 June 1865 and Assistant Quartermaster-General in Canada with effect from the same date. He was actively employed the following year in the defence of Canada from Fenian raids launched from the United States.  He was appointed Deputy Quartermaster-General in Canada on 1 October 1867. In 1869 his Soldiers' Pocket Book for Field Service was published, and has since run through many editions. In 1870, he successfully commanded the Red River Expedition to establish Canadian sovereignty over the North-West Territories and Manitoba.  Manitoba had entered Canadian Confederation when the Hudson's Bay Company transferred its control of Rupert's Land to the government of the Dominion of Canada.  British and Canadian authorities ignored the pre-existing Council of Assiniboia and botched negotiations with its replacement, the Métis' rebel provisional government headed by Louis Riel. The campaign to put down the rebellion was made difficult by the poor communications at the time. Fort Garry (now Winnipeg), the capital of Manitoba, was a small centre separated from Ontario by the rocks and forests of the Canadian Shield region.  The easiest route to Fort Garry that did not pass through the United States was through a network of rivers and lakes extending for six hundred miles from Lake Superior, infrequently traversed by non-aboriginals, and where no supplies were obtainable. The admirable arrangements made and the careful organization of the transport reflected great credit to the commander (Wolseley), who upon his return home was made a Knight Commander of the Order of St Michael and St George on 22 December 1870, and a Companion of the Order of the Bath on 13 March 1871.

Cardwell reforms
Appointed assistant adjutant-general at the War Office in 1871, he furthered the Cardwell schemes of army reform. The reforms met strong opposition from senior military figures led by the Duke of Cambridge, Commander-in-Chief of the Forces. At their heart was the intent to expand greatly the Army's latent strength by building reserves, both through introducing legislation for 'short service', which allowed soldiers to serve the second part of their term on the reserve, and by bringing militia (i.e. non-regular) battalions into the new localised regimental structure. Resistance in the Army continued and, in a series of subsequent military posts, Wolseley fought publicly as well as inside the Army's structure to implement them, long after the legislation had passed and Cardwell had gone.

Ashanti

On 2 October 1873, Wolseley became Governor of Sierra Leone British West African Settlements, and the Governor of the Gold Coast. As Governor of both British Territories in West Africa he had charge over the Colonies of Gambia, Gold Coast and Western, Eastern, and Northern Nigeria, and in this role, commanded an expedition against the Ashanti Empire. Wolseley made all his arrangements at Gold Coast before the arrival of the troops in January 1874. At the Battle of Amoaful on 31 January, Wolseley's expedition defeated the numerically superior Chief Amankwatia's army in a four-hour battle, advancing through thick bush in loose squares. After five days' fighting, ending with the Battle of Ordashu, the British entered the capital Kumasi, which they burned. Wolseley completed the campaign in two months, and re-embarked his troops for home before the unhealthy season began.  This campaign made him a household name in Britain. He received the thanks of both houses of Parliament and a grant of £25,000, was promoted to brevet major-general for distinguished service in the field on 1 April 1874, received the medal and clasp, and was made Knight Grand Cross of the Order of St Michael and St George on 31 March 1874, and a Knight Commander of the Order of the Bath. The freedom of the city of London was conferred upon him with a sword of honour, and he was made honorary DCL of Oxford and LL.D of Cambridge universities.

Service at home, and in Natal, Cyprus, and South Africa

On his return home he was appointed inspector-general of Auxiliary Forces with effect from 1 April 1874. In his role with the Auxiliary Forces, he directed his efforts to building up adequate volunteer reserve forces. Finding himself opposed by the senior military, he wrote a strong memorandum and spoke of resigning when they tried to persuade him to withdraw it. He became a lifelong advocate of the volunteer reserves, later commenting that all military reforms since 1860 in the British Army had first been introduced by the volunteers.
Shortly after, in consequence of the indigenous unrest in Natal, he was sent to that colony as governor and general-commanding on 24 February 1875.

Wolseley accepted a seat on the Council of India in November 1876 and was promoted to the substantive rank of major-general on 1 October 1877. He was promoted to brevet lieutenant-general on 25 March 1878. 
On 12 July 1878, he was appointed the first High Commissioner to Cyprus, a newly acquired possession.

In the following year, he was sent to South Africa to supersede Lord Chelmsford in command of the forces in the Zulu War, and as governor of Natal and the Transvaal and the High Commissioner of Southern Africa.  Wolseley with his 'Ashanti Ring' of adherents was sent to Durban.  But on arrival in July, he found that the Zulu War was practically over. After effecting a temporary settlement, he went on to the Transvaal. While serving in South Africa, he was promoted to brevet general on 4 June 1879. Having reorganized the administration there and reduced King Sekhukhune of the Bapedi to submission, he returned to London in May 1880.  For his services in South Africa, he was awarded the South Africa Medal with clasp, and was advanced to Knight Grand Cross of the Order of the Bath on 19 June 1880. Finally, as if to signify a meteoric rise in Imperial esteem, he was appointed Quartermaster-General to the Forces on 1 July 1880. He found that there was still great resistance to the short service system and used his growing public persona to fight for the Cardwell reforms, especially on building up reserves, including making a speech at a banquet in Mansion house in which he commented: '...how an Army raised under the long service system totally disappeared in a few months under the walls of Sevastopol.'

Egypt, the Nile Expedition and Commander-in-Chief

On 1 April 1882, Wolseley was appointed Adjutant-General to the Forces, and, in August of that year, given command of the British forces in Egypt under Khedive Tewfik to suppress the Urabi Revolt. Having seized the Suez Canal, he then disembarked his troops at Ismailia and, after a very short campaign, completely defeated Urabi Pasha at the Battle of Tel el-Kebir, thereby suppressing yet another rebellion. For his services, he was promoted to the substantive rank of general on 18 November and raised to the peerage as Baron Wolseley, of Cairo and of Wolseley in the County of Stafford. He also received the thanks of Parliament and the Egypt Medal with clasp; the Order of Osmanieh, First Class, as bestowed by the Khedive; and the more dubious accolade of a composition in his honour by poetaster William Topaz McGonagall.

On 1 September 1884, Wolseley was again called away from his duties as adjutant-general, to command the Nile Expedition for the relief of General Gordon and the besieged garrison at Khartoum.  Wolseley's unusual strategy was to take an expedition by boat up the Nile and then to cross the desert to Khartoum, while the naval boats went on to Khartoum. The expedition arrived too late; Khartoum had been taken, and Gordon was dead. In the spring of 1885, complications with Imperial Russia over the Panjdeh Incident occurred, and the withdrawal of that particular expedition followed.  For his services there, he received two clasps to his Egyptian medal, the thanks of Parliament, and on 28 September 1885 was created Viscount Wolseley, of Wolseley in the County of Stafford, and a Knight of the Order of St Patrick. At the invitation of the Queen, the Wolseley family moved from their former home at 6 Hill Street, London to the much grander Ranger's House in Greenwich in autumn 1888.

Wolseley continued at the War Office as Adjutant-General to the Forces until 1890, when he became Commander-in-Chief, Ireland. He was promoted to be a field marshal on 26 May 1894, and appointed by the Conservative government to succeed the Duke of Cambridge as Commander-in-Chief of the Forces on 1 November 1895. This was the position to which his great experience in the field and his previous signal success at the War Office itself had fully entitled him, but it was increasingly irrelevant.  Field Marshal Viscount Wolseley's powers in that office were, however, limited by a new Order in Council, and after holding the appointment for over five years, he handed over the command-in-chief to his fellow field marshal, Earl Roberts, on 3 January 1901. He had also suffered from a serious illness in 1897, from which he never fully recovered.

The unexpectedly large force required for the initial phase of the Second Boer War, was mainly furnished by means of the system of reserves Wolseley had originated. By drawing on regular reservists and volunteer reserves, Britain was able to assemble the largest army it had ever deployed abroad. Nevertheless, the new conditions at the War Office were not to his liking.  The fiasco now called Black Week culminated in his dismissal over Christmastide 1900.  Upon being released from responsibilities he brought the whole subject before the House of Lords in a speech.

Lord Wolseley was Gold Stick in Waiting to Queen Victoria and took part in the funeral procession following the death of Queen Victoria in February 1901. He also served as Gold Stick in Waiting to King Edward during his coronation in August 1902.

Honorific and royal appointments

In early 1901, Lord Wolseley was appointed by King Edward to lead a special diplomatic mission to announce the King's accession to the governments of Austria-Hungary, Romania, Serbia, the Ottoman Empire and Greece. During his visit to Constantinople, the Sultan presented him with the Order of Osmanieh set in brilliants.

He was among the original recipients of the Order of Merit in the 1902 Coronation Honours list published on 26 June 1902, and received the order from King Edward VII at Buckingham Palace on 8 August 1902. For his service with the Volunteer Force, he was awarded the Volunteer Officers' Decoration on 11 August 1903. He was also honorary colonel of the 23rd Middlesex Regiment from 12 May 1883, honorary colonel of the Queen's Rifle Volunteer Brigade, the Royal Scots (Lothian Regiment) from 24 April 1889, colonel of the Royal Horse Guards from 29 March 1895 and colonel-in-chief of the Royal Irish Regiment from 20 July 1898.

In retirement, he was a member of the council of the Union-Castle Steamship Company.

Channel Tunnel

Wolseley was deeply opposed to Sir Edward Watkin's attempt to build a Channel Tunnel. He gave evidence to a parliamentary commission that the construction might be "calamitous for England", he added that "No matter what fortifications and defences were built, there would always be the peril of some continental army seizing the tunnel exit by surprise." Various contrivances to satisfy his objections were put forward including looping the line on a viaduct from the Cliffs of Dover and back into them, so that the connection could be bombarded at will by the Royal Navy. For a combination of reasons over 100 years were to pass before a permanent link was made.

Personal life and death

Wolseley was married in 1867 to Louisa (1843–1920), the daughter of Mr. A. Erskine. His only child, Frances (1872–1936) was an author and founded the College for Lady Gardeners at Glynde. She was heiress to the viscountcy under special remainder, but it became extinct after her death.

In his later years, Lord and Lady Wolseley lived in a grace-and-favour apartment at Hampton Court Palace. He and his wife were wintering at Villa Tourrette, Menton on the French Riviera, where he fell ill with influenza and died on 26 March 1913.

He was buried on 31 March 1913 in the crypt of St Paul's Cathedral, to music played by the band of the 2nd Battalion Royal Irish Regiment, of which he was the first Colonel-in-Chief.

Legacy

There is an equestrian statue of Wolseley in Horse Guards Parade in London. This was sculpted by Sir William Goscombe John R.A. and erected in 1920.
Wolseley Barracks, at London, Ontario, is a Canadian military base (now officially known as ASU London), established in 1886.  It is on the site of Wolseley Hall, the first building constructed by a Canadian Government specifically to house an element of the newly created Permanent Force. Wolseley Barracks has been continuously occupied by the Canadian Army since its creation, and has always housed some element of The Royal Canadian Regiment.  At present, Wolseley Hall is occupied by the Royal Canadian Regiment Museum and the regiment's 4th Battalion, among other tenants. The white pith helmet worn as part of the full-dress uniform of the RCR and many other Canadian regiments is known as a Wolseley helmet. Wolseley is also a senior boys house at the Duke of York's Royal Military School.

Field Marshal Lord Wolseley is commemorated by a tablet at St Michael and All Angels Church in Colwich, Staffordshire, a short distance from Shugborough Hall and Wolseley Park at Colwich, near Rugeley. The church was the burial place of the Wolseley baronets of Wolseley Park, the ancestral home of the Wolseley family.

W. S. Gilbert, of the musical partnership Gilbert and Sullivan, deliberately modelled the character of Major-General Stanley in the operetta The Pirates of Penzance on Wolseley, as did George Grossmith, the actor who first created the role in the opening theatrical run. In another of Gilbert and Sullivan's operettas, Patience, Colonel Calverley praises Wolseley in the phrase: "Skill of Sir Garnet in thrashing a cannibal".

The residential areas of Wolseley in Winnipeg, Manitoba, Canada, located in the west central part of the city and of Wolseley, Saskatchewan, Canada, are named after him 
The town of Wolseley, Western Cape, South Africa, is named after Sir Garnet Joseph Wolseley. It was established on the farm Goedgevonden in 1875 and attained municipal status in 1955; prior to this it was known as Ceres Road.

The Sir Garnet pub in the centre of Norwich, overlooking the historic market place and city hall, is named after Field Marshal Lord Wolseley.  The pub opened in about 1861 and adopted the name Sir Garnet Wolseley in 1874, changed after a brief closing (2011–2012) to Sir Garnet.

Wolseley's uniforms, field marshal's baton and souvenirs from his various campaigns are held in the collections of the Glenbow Museum in Calgary, Alberta, Canada.  Wolseley maintained a deep interest in notable individuals in early modern European history, and collected items related to many of them (for example, a box from Sir Francis Drake, a watch related to Oliver Cromwell, a funerary badge for Admiral Horatio Nelson and General James Wolfe's snuff box).  These are also held in the collection.

In recognition of his success, an expression arose: "all Sir Garnet" meaning; that everything is in good order.

Selected publications by Viscount Wolseley

See also
 Royal Horse Guards
 British Cavalry
 British Army
 Essex Regiment

References

Bibliography

 

 
 
 

 Hamer, William Spencer. The British Army; civil-military relations, 1885–1905 (1970).

 
 Holt, Edgar. "Garnet Wolseley: Soldier of Empire" History Today (Oct 1958) 8#10 pp 706–713.

Primary sources

External links 

 Biography at the Dictionary of Canadian Biography Online
 
 

 

|-

1833 births
1913 deaths
19th-century Anglo-Irish people
Barons in the Peerage of the United Kingdom
British Army personnel of the Anglo-Egyptian War
British Army personnel of the Anglo-Zulu War
British Army personnel of the Crimean War
British Army personnel of the Mahdist War
British Army personnel of the Second Opium War
British field marshals
British military personnel of the Indian Rebellion of 1857
British Army personnel of the Second Anglo-Burmese War
British military personnel of the Third Anglo-Ashanti War
Burials at St Paul's Cathedral
Commanders-in-Chief, Ireland
Freemasons of the United Grand Lodge of England
Governors of Natal
Governors of the Gold Coast (British colony)
High Commissioners of the United Kingdom to Cyprus
Irish Freemasons
Knights Grand Cross of the Order of St Michael and St George
Knights Grand Cross of the Order of the Bath
Knights of St Patrick
Members of the Council of India
Members of the Order of Merit
Members of the Privy Council of Ireland
Members of the Privy Council of the United Kingdom
Military personnel from Dublin (city)
People of the Fenian raids
People of the Red River Rebellion
People of the Sekukuni Campaign
Recipients of the Order of the Medjidie, 5th class
Royal Horse Guards officers
Suffolk Regiment officers
Transvaal Colony people
Viscounts in the Peerage of the United Kingdom
Governors of the Transvaal
Peers of the United Kingdom created by Queen Victoria